Mount Grinnell is a peak located in the heart of Glacier National Park in the U.S. state of Montana. Lying just east of the Continental Divide in the Many Glacier region of the park, the peak is flanked to the northwest by Swiftcurrent Glacier and to the south by Grinnell Glacier. Mount Grinnell is named after George Bird Grinnell. From the Many Glacier Hotel on Swiftcurrent Lake, the eastern arm of Mount Grinnell, known as Grinnell Point, hides the main summit.

See also
 Mountains and mountain ranges of Glacier National Park (U.S.)

References

External links
 

Mountains of Glacier National Park (U.S.)
Mountains of Glacier County, Montana
Lewis Range
Mountains of Montana